Sweet Nothing is the third studio album by Australian singer-songwriter Tex Perkins, and first credited to Tex Perkins' Dark Horses. The album was released in July 2003 and peaked at number 34 on the ARIA Charts.

Critical reception

The Sydney Morning Herald said "Perkins has swapped the rock'n'roll swagger of his earlier days for evocative poetry, such as that found on the chorus of track two 'Tonight we swim in midnight sunshine'. What's surprising is that his rough rumble of a voice is so suited to restraint."

The Age said "Perkins' smoky, cracked voice is at its best out in front... but generally it serves as an accompaniment to the lush instrumentation, particularly Charlie Owen's dobro, lap steel and shimmering keyboards, and is complemented by Silbersher's falsetto backing vocals. Owen and Silbersher are the masters of understatement; they know as much as anyone that what you don't do is as important as what you do. The songs, recorded on Perkins' mobile recording system at his rural property, retain their intimacy, so much so that you can hear breathing and, almost, thoughts." calling the album "A sublime winter album to get lost in."

Track listing

Personnel
 Tex Perkins – vocals, acoustic guitar
 Charlie Owen – dobro, lap steel, electric, keyboards
 Murray Paterson – acoustic guitar
 Joel Silbersher – bass
 Richard Needham – backing vocals, drums

Charts

Release history

References

2003 albums
Universal Music Australia albums
Tex Perkins albums